Soil carbon is the solid carbon stored in global soils. This includes both soil organic matter and inorganic carbon as carbonate minerals. Soil carbon is a carbon sink in regard to the global carbon cycle, playing a role in biogeochemistry, climate change mitigation, and constructing global climate models.

Overview

Soil carbon is present in two forms: inorganic and organic. Soil inorganic carbon consists of mineral forms of carbon, either from weathering of parent material, or from reaction of soil minerals with atmospheric CO2. Carbonate minerals are the dominant form of soil carbon in desert climates. Soil organic carbon is present as soil organic matter.  It includes relatively available carbon as fresh plant remains and relatively inert carbon in materials derived from plant remains: humus and charcoal.

Global carbon cycle

Although exact quantities are difficult to measure, human activities have caused substantial losses of soil organic carbon. Of the 2,700 Gt of carbon stored in soils worldwide, 1550 GtC is organic and 950 GtC is inorganic carbon, which is approximately three times greater than the current atmospheric carbon and 240 times higher compared with the current annual fossil fuel emission. The balance of soil carbon is held in peat and wetlands (150 GtC), and in plant litter at the soil surface (50 GtC). This compares to 780 GtC in the atmosphere, and 600 GtC in all living organisms. The oceanic pool of carbon accounts for 38,200 GtC.

About 60 GtC/yr accumulates in the soil. This 60 GtC/yr is the balance of 120 GtC/yr contracted from the atmosphere by terrestrial plant photosynthesis reduced by 60 GtC/yr of plant respiration. An equivalent 60 GtC/yr is respired from soil, joining the 60G tC/yr plant respiration to return to the atmosphere.

Organic carbon

Soil organic carbon is divided between living soil biota and dead biotic material derived from biomass.  Together these comprise the soil food web, with the living component sustained by the biotic material component. Soil biota includes earthworms, nematodes, protozoa, fungi, bacteria and different arthropods.

Detritus resulting from plant senescence is the major source of soil organic carbon. Plant materials, with cell walls high in cellulose and lignin, are decomposed and the not-respired carbon is retained as humus. Cellulose and starches readily degrade, resulting in short residence times. More persistent forms of organic C include lignin, humus, organic matter encapsulated in soil aggregates, and charcoal. These resist alteration and have long residence times.

Soil organic carbon tends to be concentrated in the topsoil. Topsoil ranges from 0.5% to 3.0% organic carbon for most upland soils. Soils with less than 0.5% organic C are mostly limited to desert areas. Soils containing greater than 12–18% organic carbon are generally classified as organic soils. High levels of organic C develop in soils supporting wetland ecology, flood deposition, fire ecology, and human activity.

Fire derived forms of carbon are present in most soils as unweathered charcoal and weathered black carbon. Soil organic carbon is typically 5–50% derived from char, with levels above 50% encountered in mollisol, chernozem, and terra preta soils.

Root exudates are another source of soil carbon. 5–20% of the total plant carbon fixed during photosynthesis is supplied as root exudates in support of rhizospheric mutualistic biota. Microbial populations are typically higher in the rhizosphere than in adjacent bulk soil.

SOC and other soil properties 
Soil organic carbon (SOC) concentrations in sandy soils influence soil bulk density which decreases with an increase in SOC. Bulk density is important for calculating SOC stocks  and higher SOC concentrations increase SOC stocks but the effect will be somewhat reduced by the decrease in bulk density. Soil organic carbon increased the cation exchange capacity (CEC), a measure of soil fertility, in sandy soils. SOC was higher in sandy soils with higher pH.  found that up to 76% of the variation in CEC was caused by SOC, and up to 95% of variation in CEC was attributed to SOC and pH. Soil organic matter and specific surface area has been shown to account for 97% of variation in CEC whereas clay content accounts for 58%. Soil organic carbon increased with an increase in silt and clay content. The silt and clay size fractions have the ability to protect SOC in soil aggregates. When organic matter decomposes, the organic matter binds with silt and clay forming aggregates. Soil organic carbon is higher in silt and clay sized fractions than in sand sized fractions, and is generally highest in the clay sized fractions.

Soil health

Organic carbon is vital to soil capacity to provide edaphic ecosystem services. The condition of this capacity is termed soil health, a term that communicates the value of understanding soil as a living system as opposed to an abiotic component. Specific carbon related benchmarks used to evaluate soil health include CO2 release, humus levels, and microbial metabolic activity.

Losses
The exchange of carbon between soils and the atmosphere is a significant part of the world carbon cycle. Carbon, as it relates to the organic matter of soils, is a major component of soil and catchment health. Several factors affect the variation that exists in soil organic matter and soil carbon; the most significant has, in contemporary times, been the influence of humans and agricultural systems.

Although exact quantities are difficult to measure, human activities have caused massive losses of soil organic carbon. First was the use of fire, which removes soil cover and leads to immediate and continuing losses of soil organic carbon. Tillage and drainage both expose soil organic matter to oxygen and oxidation. In the Netherlands, East Anglia, Florida, and the California Delta, subsidence of peat lands from oxidation has been severe as a result of tillage and drainage. Grazing management that exposes soil (through either excessive or insufficient recovery periods) can also cause losses of soil organic carbon.

Managing soil carbon
Natural variations in soil carbon occur as a result of climate, organisms, parent material, time, and relief. The greatest contemporary influence has been that of humans; for example, carbon in Australian agricultural soils may historically have been twice the present range that is typically from 1.6 to 4.6 per cent.

It has long been encouraged that farmers adjust practices to maintain or increase the organic component in the soil. On one hand, practices that hasten oxidation of carbon (such as burning crop stubbles or over-cultivation) are discouraged; on the other hand, incorporation of organic material (such as in manuring) has been encouraged. Increasing soil carbon is not a straightforward matter; it is made complex by the relative activity of soil biota, which can consume and release carbon and are made more active by the addition of nitrogen fertilizers.

Data available on soil organic carbon

Europe
The most homogeneous and comprehensive data on the organic carbon/matter content of European soils remain those that can be extracted and/or derived from the European Soil Database in combination with associated databases on land cover, climate, and topography. The modelled data refer to carbon content (%) in the surface horizon of soils in Europe. In an inventory on available national datasets, seven member states of the European Union have available datasets on organic carbon. In the article  "Estimating soil organic carbon in Europe based on data collected through a European network" (Ecological Indicators 24, pp. 439–450), a comparison of national data with modelled data is performed. The LUCAS soil organic carbon data are measured surveyed points and the aggregated results at regional level show important findings. Finally, a new proposed model for estimation of soil organic carbon in agricultural soils has  estimated current top SOC stock of 17.63 Gt in EU agricultural soils. This modelling framework has been updated by integrating the soil erosion component to estimate the lateral carbon fluxes.

Managing for catchment health

Much of the contemporary literature on soil carbon relates to its role, or potential, as an atmospheric carbon sink to offset climate change. Despite this emphasis, a much wider range of soil and catchment health aspects are improved as soil carbon is increased. These benefits are difficult to quantify, due to the complexity of natural resource systems and the interpretation of what constitutes soil health; nonetheless, several benefits are proposed in the following points:

Reduced erosion, sedimentation: increased soil aggregate stability means greater resistance to erosion; mass movement is less likely when soils are able to retain structural strength under greater moisture levels.
Greater productivity: healthier and more productive soils can contribute to positive socio-economic circumstances.
Cleaner waterways, nutrients and turbidity: nutrients and sediment tend to be retained by the soil rather than leach or wash off, and are so kept from waterways.
Water balance: greater soil water holding capacity reduces overland flow and recharge to groundwater; the water saved and held by the soil remains available for use by plants.
Climate change: Soils have the ability to retain carbon that may otherwise exist as atmospheric CO2 and contribute to global warming.
Greater biodiversity: soil organic matter contributes to the health of soil flora and, accordingly, the natural links with biodiversity in the greater biosphere.

Forest soils
Forest soils constitute a large pool of carbon. Anthropogenic activities such as deforestation cause releases of carbon from this pool, which may significantly increase the concentration of greenhouse gas (GHG) in the atmosphere. Under the United Nations Framework Convention on Climate Change (UNFCCC), countries must estimate and report GHG emissions and removals, including changes in carbon stocks in all five pools (above- and below-ground biomass, dead wood, litter, and soil carbon) and associated emissions and removals from land use, land-use change and forestry activities, according to the Intergovernmental Panel on Climate Change's good practice guidance. Tropical deforestation represents nearly 25 percent of total anthropogenic GHG emissions worldwide. Deforestation, forest degradation, and changes in land management practices can cause releases of carbon from soil to the atmosphere.  For these reasons, reliable estimates of soil organic carbon stock and stock changes are needed for Reducing emissions from deforestation and forest degradation and GHG reporting under the UNFCCC. 

The government of Tanzania—together with the Food and Agriculture Organization of the United Nations and the financial support of the government of Finland—have implemented a forest soil carbon monitoring program to estimate soil carbon stock, using both survey and modelling-based methods. 

West Africa has experienced significant loss of forest that contains high levels of soil organic carbon. This is mostly due to expansion of small scale, non-mechanized agriculture using burning as a form of land clearance

See also
 Biochar
 Biosequestration
 Carbon cycle
 Carbon sequestration
 Coarse woody debris
 Mycorrhizal fungi and soil carbon storage
 Soil regeneration and climate change

References

Carbon
Land management
Carbon
Soil science